The King's Medal of Merit (Norwegian: Kongens fortjenstmedalje) is a Norwegian award. It was instituted in 1908 to reward meritorious achievements in the fields of art, science, business, and public service. It is divided in two classes: gold and silver. The medal in gold is rewarded for extraordinary achievements of importance to the nation and society. The medal in silver may be awarded for lesser achievements. The medal is suspended from a ribbon in the colours of the Royal Standard of Norway.

The medal in gold is ranked eighth in the ranking of Norwegian orders and medals. The medal in silver is ranked 11th.

Design of the Medal
 The obverse shows the head of the reigning Monarch with name and motto. To date (2015) there have been three versions: Haakon VII (1908–1957), Olav V (1957–1991), and Harald V (since 1991).
 The reverse bears a wreath and the words "KONGENS FORTJENSTMEDALJE" (Royal Medal of Merit) with the recipient's name engraved in the middle of the wreath.
 The ribbon is red with a yellow central stripe.

See also
 Orders, decorations, and medals of Norway

References

External links
 The Royal House of Norway: HM The King's Medal of Merit
 ODM web page

Norwegian monarchy
Orders, decorations, and medals of Norway